Ukko-Pekka Luukkonen (born 9 March 1999) is a Finnish professional ice hockey goaltender for  the Buffalo Sabres of the National Hockey League (NHL).

Playing career
Luukkonen has formerly played for HPK of the Liiga and for LeKi of Mestis. After playing for HPK's U20 team, he was drafted by the Buffalo Sabres, 54th overall, in the 2017 NHL Entry Draft. He was also previously drafted in 2016 by Severstal Cherepovets of the Kontinental Hockey League (KHL), 122nd overall, but never played for them.

On 15 June 2018, Luukkonen agreed to a three-year, entry-level contract with the Sabres. Luukkonen was selected third overall by the Sudbury Wolves in the 2018 CHL Import Draft.

In the 2018–19 season, his first in North America playing major junior hockey, Luukkonen set the Sudbury Wolves franchise record for most wins in a regular season, and led the Ontario Hockey League (OHL) in wins, save percentage, and shutouts. Luukkonen was the first European import player to win the Red Tilson Trophy as the league's most outstanding player.

On 12 April 2019, Luukkonen signed an amateur tryout contract with the Rochester Americans, the American Hockey League (AHL) affiliate of the Buffalo Sabres. On 14 April, Luukkonen made his professional ice hockey debut with Rochester, earning a victory in a 4–2 win over the Belleville Senators. Following the conclusion of the 2018–19 season, Luukkonen underwent successful hip surgery.

Following his return from hip surgery, Luukkonen spent the majority of the 2019–20 season with the Cincinnati Cyclones of the ECHL where he was named ECHL Goaltender of the Month for November 2019, and represented the team at the ECHL All-Star Game.

On 18 August 2020, Luukkonen agreed to return to the Finnish Liiga on loan from the Sabres with TPS for an initial period of 4–6 weeks due to the delayed 2020–21 North American season. He played 13 games for the team between October 2020 and January 2021 before returning to North America.

On 23 April 2021, Luukkonen made his NHL debut and recorded his first NHL win in a 6–4 win over the Boston Bruins.

In January 2023, Luukkonen was named NHL Rookie of the Month with six wins in nine starts and a .907 save percentage for the month.

International play

Luukkonen played for Finland in the U18 and U20 World Junior Championships. He won a gold medal at the U18 World Juniors in 2016, stepping in as starter when Leevi Laakso got sick and the silver medal in 2017. He won the gold again at the 2019 World Junior Ice Hockey Championships in a 3–2 victory over the United States national junior team and was named the media's pick for best goaltender of the tournament.

Personal life
Luukkonen was born in Espoo, but he and his family moved to Hyvinkää when he was five years old. As a child, Luukkonen played soccer, floorball, and flute. His older brother, Nuutti Luukkonen, also played ice hockey at the junior level.

Luukkonen was named after former Finnish president Pehr Evind Svinhufvud's nickname.

Career statistics

Regular season and playoffs

International

Awards and honours

References

External links
 

1999 births
Living people
Buffalo Sabres draft picks
Buffalo Sabres players
Cincinnati Cyclones (ECHL) players
Finnish ice hockey goaltenders
HC TPS players
HPK players
Lempäälän Kisa players
Rochester Americans players
Sportspeople from Espoo
Sudbury Wolves players